The Yakovlev Yak-35MV was a low-altitude tactical fighter / interceptor project of the Soviet Union from the late 1950s, which suffered from a lack of funding, in the wake of the expected total reliance on guided missiles in the near future. In addition to financial problems, the engines were found to be under-developed and the project failed to progress further than the drawing board.

Design and development

Specifications (Yak-35MV estimated)

References

Further reading
 

Bomber aircraft
Abandoned military aircraft projects of the Soviet Union
Yakovlev aircraft
Tailless delta-wing aircraft